Josef Jurkanin (born 5 March 1949) is a retired Czech footballer.

During his career, he played for AC Sparta Prague. He earned 12 caps for the Czechoslovakia national football team and participated in the 1970 FIFA World Cup.

External links
 
 

1949 births
Living people
Czech footballers
Czechoslovak footballers
Czechoslovakia international footballers
1970 FIFA World Cup players
AC Sparta Prague players
FK Teplice players
SK Slavia Prague players
Association football midfielders
Footballers from Prague